Gabriele von Wartensleben (April 24, 1870 – August 12, 1953) was a German psychologist who published the first academic statement on Gestalt theory. She additionally was the first woman to receive a PhD in psychology from University of Vienna through an honorary degree.

Personal life 
Gabriele von Wartensleben was born in the Bavarian town of Ansbach on April 24, 1870. Her family was educated: her father Ferdinand Freiherr von Andrian-Werburg worked with anthropology and ethnography; her mother Cäcilie was the daughter of opera composer Giacomo Meyerbeer; her brother Leopold Andrian (1875-1951) became an Austrian diplomat, author and dramatist.

Her marriage to Dr. Konrad Graf Wartensleben resulted in a son, who died at the age of twenty years. The couple was divorced in Berlin after five years in 1895.

Education and career 

In 1895, Gabriele von Wartensleben graduated from the University of Zurich, studied classical philology and classical archeology. Her doctoral thesis on the concept of the Greek chreia and contributions to the history of its form was submitted to the University of Vienna, where, on May 3, 1900, she became the first female doctoral student to receive her doctorate (without having ever studied there).

In 1913, while studying at the Frankfurt Academy for Social Sciences, she was in the spheres of  Max Wertheimer and Wolfgang Köhler, two of the founders of Gestalt theory, even recruiting them for her own psychology experiments. In that same year, she graduated from the Frankfurt Academy with a doctorate and began teaching.

In 1914, she wrote and published a long footnote in The Christian personality in the ideal image which is the first published reference to Gestalt theory.

By the mid-1920s, Gabriele was teaching around Germany before moving to the principality of Liechtenstein for eight years. From 1933 until her death in 1953 she lived in the Swiss city of Basel and continued her career as an author and teacher. She was buried at the cemetery of Schaan, Liechtenstein, in the tomb of German biologist Maria von Linden (1869-1936), who was the first woman in Germany to receive the title of a professor and with whom she had a lifelong friendship.

Selected publications 
 Concept of Greek chreia and contributions to the history of its form. Heidelberg: Winter, 1901.
 "Contributions to the psychology of translation". In: Zeitschrift für Psychologie 57, 1910, pp. 90–115.
 "About the influence of the meantime on the reproduction of read letters". In: Zeitschrift für Psychologie 64, 1913, pp. 321–385.
 The Christian personality in the ideal image. A description of sub specie psychologica. Kempten and Munich: Kösel, 1914.
 Truthfulness and being fulfilled. Regensburg: Habbel, 1925.

References 

1870 births
1953 deaths
German women psychologists
German psychologists
Gestalt psychologists
University of Vienna alumni
University of Zurich alumni